In mathematics, the concepts of essential infimum and essential supremum are related to the notions of infimum and supremum, but adapted to measure theory and functional analysis, where one often deals with statements that are not valid for all elements in a set, but rather almost everywhere, that is, except on a set of measure zero.

While the exact definition is not immediately straightforward, intuitively the essential supremum of a function is the smallest value that is greater than or equal to the function values everywhere while ignoring what the function does at a set of points of measure zero. For example, if one takes the function  that is equal to zero everywhere except at  where  then the supremum of the function equals one. However, its essential supremum is zero because we are allowed to ignore what the function does at the single point where  is peculiar. The essential infimum is defined in a similar way.

Definition 

As is often the case in measure-theoretic questions, the definition of essential supremum and infimum does not start by asking what a function  does at points  (that is, the image of ), but rather by asking for the set of points  where  equals a specific value  (that is, the preimage of  under ).

Let  be a real valued function defined on a set  The supremum of a function is  characterized by the following property:  for all  and if for some  we have  for all  then  
More concretely, a real number  is called an upper bound for  if  for all  that is, if the set

is empty. Let

if the set of upper bounds  is nonempty, and  otherwise.

Now assume in addition that  is a measure space and, for simplicity, assume that the function  is measurable.

be the set of essential upper bounds.

if  and  otherwise.

if the set of essential lower bounds is nonempty, and as  otherwise; again there is an alternative expression as 
 
(with this being  if the set is empty).

Examples

On the real line consider the Lebesgue measure and its corresponding -algebra  Define a function  by the formula

The supremum of this function (largest value) is 5, and the infimum (smallest value) is −4. However, the function takes these values only on the sets  and  respectively, which are of measure zero. Everywhere else, the function takes the value 2. Thus, the essential supremum and the essential infimum of this function are both 2.

As another example, consider the function

where  denotes the rational numbers. However, from the point of view of the Lebesgue measure, the set of rational numbers is of measure zero; thus, what really matters is what happens in the complement of this set, where the function is given as  It follows that the essential supremum is  while the essential infimum is  

Lastly, consider the function

Then for any   and so  and

Properties

If  then 
 
and otherwise, if  has measure zero then 

Given a measure space  the space  consisting of all of measurable functions that are bounded almost everywhere is a seminormed space whose seminorm

is the essential supremum of a function's absolute value when

See also

Notes

References

Integral calculus
Measure theory
Lp spaces